A special election was held in  September 14–16, 1803 to fill a vacancy left by the death of Isaac Bloom (DR) on April 26, 1803, after the start of the 8th Congress, but before the first session began.

Election results

See also
List of special elections to the United States House of Representatives

References

New York 1803 06
New York 1803 06
1803 06
New York 06
United States House of Representatives 06
United States House of Representatives 1803 06